James D. Blankenbecler (June 27, 1963 – October 1, 2003) was an American command sergeant major and the highest-ranking enlisted soldier to be killed by hostile fire in the Iraq War.

Early life and education 
Blankenbecler was born on June 27, 1963, in Arlington County, Virginia. Blankenbecler grew up in Northern Virginia and attended Groveton High School (now West Potomac High School).

Military career 
Blankenbecler joined the United States Army in 1983 and served during the Gulf War and at Fort Belvoir.

In 2003, Blankenbecler was assigned to the 1st Battalion, 44th Air Defense Artillery Regiment at Fort Hood, Texas and deployed to Iraq.

Death and legacy 
Blankenbecler died on October 1, 2003, in Samarra, Iraq, due to injuries sustained after being in convoy that was "hit by an improvised explosive device and rocket-propelled grenades".

In 2005, a bill was passed by the Virginia General Assembly to honor Blankenbecler.

In 2014, the CSM James D. Blankenbecler Resilience Center was opened and dedicated in Blankenbecler's name.

In 2018, West Potomac High School held a Veteran's Day of Service to honor Blankenbecler.

References 

1963 births
2003 deaths
United States Army personnel of the Iraq War
United States Army non-commissioned officers
American military personnel killed in the Iraq War